Vazante is a Brazilian-Portuguese historical drama adventure film about slavery in 1820s Brazil, directed by Daniela Thomas. The film premiered in the Panorama section of the 67th Berlin International Film Festival.

Plot
In 1821 a slave trader and miner, Antonio, returns home with imported African slaves only to discover his wife has died in childbirth along with their son. In grief he abandons his home and heads to the wild. As the mines have dried up and there is no other work or chance of money, Antonio's brother-in-law, Batholomeu, decides to take the slaves to be sold himself. On the journey the slaves manage to overpower Batholomeu and free themselves from their coffle. However as the leader of the group is fleeing he comes across Antonio who is close to death and saves him by returning him to his family.

Antonio re-enslaves the man who saved him. He remains despondent until he is approached by a free black man, Jeremias, who offers to turn his land into a profitable farm. During the burning of the brush Antonio briefly glimpses Beatriz, Batholomeu's youngest daughter who was attracted by the fire. Though she has not yet begun to menstruate, he decides to marry her, much to the distress of her parents who feel they cannot say no due to Batholomeu's loss of the slaves and their own financial difficulties.

Antonio does not consummate the marriage as Beatriz is too young, and shortly after their wedding leaves to obtain grains and other goods. Meanwhile Beatriz's family decides to leave for Serro.

Lonely and bored, Beatriz befriends some of the children enslaved by her husband, including Virgílio, a boy her own age. While out playing they accidentally discover the leader of the African slaves who saved Antonio, dead. The death bonds them together, and while out in the fields together they are discovered by Jeremias and are bound and dragged back to the farm. Jeremias flees and the rest of the slaves conspire to keep the incident a secret. Shortly after Beatriz begins to menstruate for the first time.

Antonio returns home. After learning that Beatriz has begun menstruating he initially puts off consummating their marriage and rapes Virgílio's mother, Feliciana. However he soon begins raping Beatriz. Feliciana soon grows pregnant as does Beatriz. Upon learning of Beatriz's pregnancy Antonio swears he will never leave her again. Beatriz tries to run away but is caught and brought back by Antonio.

Beatriz goes into labour. Antonio leaves and when he returns discovers that Beatriz has birthed a black child, fathered by Virgílio. In a rage Antonio murders Beatriz's child and grandmother as well as Virgílio and Feliciana.

As Antonio warns the other slaves not to touch their bodies Beatriz come out of the house and retrieves Feliciana and Antonio's crying child and begins to suckle the baby.

Cast
 Adriano Carvalho as Antonio
 Luana Nastas as Beatriz
 Sandra Corveloni as Dona Ondina
 Juliana Carneiro de Cunha as Dona Zizinha
 Maria Helena Dias as Domingas
 Roberto Audio as Batholomeu
 Jai Baptista as Feliciana
 Toumani Kouyaté as Lider
 Vinícius dos Anjos as Virgílio
 Fabrício Boliveira as Jeremias
 Adilson Maghá as Porfírio
 Geisa Costa as Joana

Release

Vazante premiered in the Panorama section of the 67th Berlin International Film Festival.

Reception

, the film holds an 85% approval rating on review aggregator Rotten Tomatoes, based on 34 reviews with an average rating of 7.16/10. On Metacritic, the film has a weighted average score of 68 out of 100, based on 12 critics, indicating "generally favorable reviews".

The Hollywood Reporter described the film as 'a hushed opera that builds to a shattering climax'.

References

External links
 
 
 

2017 films
2017 drama films
Brazilian drama films
Portuguese drama films
2010s Portuguese-language films
Films directed by Daniela Thomas
Brazilian black-and-white films
Portuguese black-and-white films
Films about slavery
Films about race and ethnicity
Films set in 1821
Films set in Brazil
Films shot in Brazil